White Palms may refer to:
"White Palms", a song by Black Rebel Motorcycle Club from their 2001 album B.R.M.C.
White Palms (film) (Fehér Tenyér), a 2006 Hungarian film by director Szabolcs Hajdu that played at the 2006 Toronto International Film Festival